Stefan Fatsis (born April 1, 1963) is an American author and journalist. He regularly appears as a guest on National Public Radio's All Things Considered daily radio news program and as a panelist on Slate's sports podcast Hang Up and Listen. He is a former staff reporter for The Wall Street Journal.

Biography
Fatsis grew up in Pelham, New York. He graduated from the University of Pennsylvania in 1985 with a degree in American Civilization.  He was a staff writer for the Daily Pennsylvanian as an undergraduate. From 1985 to 1994 he was a reporter for The Associated Press in Athens, Greece; Philadelphia; Boston and New York. He wrote about sports for The Wall Street Journal from 1995 to 2006.

He is the author of three books: Wild and Outside: How a Renegade Minor League Revived the Spirit of Baseball in America's Heartland (1995); Word Freak: Heartbreak, Triumph, Genius, and Obsession in the World of Competitive Scrabble Players (2001), about the subculture of tournament Scrabble, in which Fatsis immersed himself as a player; and A Few Seconds of Panic: A 5-Foot-8, 170-Pound, 43-Year-Old Sportswriter Plays in the NFL (2008). That book was published in paperback with the abbreviated title A Few Seconds of Panic: A Sportswriter Plays in the NFL (2009). Fatsis trained as a placekicker and spent the summer of 2006 as a member of the Denver Broncos during the team's training camp (similar to the premise of George Plimpton's 1966 book Paper Lion).

Fatsis's work also appears in several anthologies: Top of the Order: 25 Writers Pick Their Favorite Baseball Player of All Time (April 2010), The Final Four of Everything (2009), Anatomy of Baseball (2008), The Best Creative Nonfiction Vol. 2 (2008) and The Enlightened Bracketologist: The Final Four of Everything (2007). He also writes or has written for The New York Times, the New York Times'''s defunct Play magazine, Sports Illustrated, SI.com, Slate, The Atlantic, The New Republic.com, Deadspin and other publications.

He lives in Washington, D.C., with his wife, former All Things Considered co-host Melissa Block, and their daughter, Chloe Fatsis.

References

External links

Stefan Fatsis's website 

Stefan Fatsis's profile page (National Scrabble Association)

Lindsay, Drew. "Stefan Fatsis: Inside a Player's Mind", Washingtonian'', June 1, 2008.

1963 births
Living people
The Wall Street Journal people
American Public Media
American Scrabble players
Journalists from Washington, D.C.
The Daily Pennsylvanian people
Writers from Chios
Place of birth missing (living people)
American writers of Greek descent
People from Pelham, New York
20th-century American non-fiction writers
21st-century American non-fiction writers
Sportswriters from New York (state)